The Jules Leffland House at 302 E. Convent in Victoria, Texas, United States, was built in 1900.  It was a home of local architect Jules Leffland.  It was listed on the National Register of Historic Places in 1991.

It has been termed an "outstanding example" of Leffland's work.

See also

National Register of Historic Places listings in Victoria County, Texas

References

Houses completed in 1900
Houses in Victoria, Texas
Houses on the National Register of Historic Places in Texas
Neoclassical architecture in Texas
National Register of Historic Places in Victoria, Texas